Nong Pling Bridge is a one-span railway bridge in Thailand. It is in Nakhon Sawan Province on the Northern Line Railway, near Nakhon Sawan Railway Station. There is only one span, with a length of about 40 metres.

Features
It is a one-span truss bridge.

References

External links
 Photos of the bridge (2008) 

 

Railway bridges in Thailand
Bridges completed in 1976
Truss bridges